Richard Anthony Dos Ramos (born September 10, 1962 in Port of Spain, Trinidad and Tobago) is a Canadian jockey in thoroughbred horse racing. He grew up in Malton, a neighbourhood in Mississauga, Ontario, where his family emigrated when he was young. He began his career in horse racing in 1981, winning the Sovereign Award for Outstanding Apprentice Jockey that year and again in 1982. 

In 1986, Dos Ramos rode Carotene to victory in the Breeders' Stakes, the third leg of the Canadian Triple Crown. He has ridden two horses who went on to be named Canada's Horse of the Year: in 1992 with Benburb he rode to victory in the 1992 Molson Export Million Stakes and in 1999 with Thornfield he captured the prestigious Canadian International Stakes 

Dos Ramos was voted the 2002 Avelino Gomez Memorial Award for his significant contribution to the sport of thoroughbred racing in Canada. During his career, he was won more than 2,000 races, of which more than 1,300 have been at his home base, Woodbine Racetrack. Racing in the United States, aboard Palladio, he won the 2005 Ohio Derby, that state's richest thoroughbred race.

Year-end charts

References
 May 17, 2002 Thoroughbred Times article titled Dos Ramos to receive Avelino Gomez Memorial Award
 October 18, 2007 Bloodhorse.com article titled Woodbine Jockey Dos Ramos Reaches 2,000-Win Milestone
 Sovereign Awards for Richard Dos Ramos at the Jockey club of Canada
 Richard Dos Ramos profile at Woodbine Entertainment Group

1962 births
Living people
Animal sportspeople from Ontario
Avelino Gomez Memorial Award winners
Canadian jockeys
Naturalized citizens of Canada
Sportspeople from Mississauga
Sportspeople from Port of Spain
Sovereign Award winners
Trinidad and Tobago emigrants to Canada